Serge Charles Jean Laget (13 February 1959 – 23 January 2023) was a French board game designer. He also worked as an education advisor near Avignon.

Biography
In 2003, Laget created the board game Mare Nostrum and its successor, Mare Nostrum: Mythology Expansion, two years later. In 2011, he created Cargo Noir and, in 2020, Nidavellir.

Serge Laget died in January 2023, at the age of 66.

Collaborations

With Bruno Faidutti
Mystery of the Abbey (1996)
Castle (2000)
Kheops (2008)
Ad Astra (2009)
ARGO (2016)

With Bruno Cathala
Shadows over Camelot (2005)
 (2006)
Senji (2008)
Mundus Novus (2011)

References

20th-century births
Year of birth missing
2023 deaths
French game designers
Board game designers
People from Avignon